This is a list of all stations of the Mumbai Metro, a rapid transit system serving Mumbai in the Mumbai Metropolitan Region of India. The Mumbai Metro is the Fifth transit system to be built in India. The first line of the Mumbai Metro was opened on 8 June 2014 with the Blue Line 1, with the current total number of 11 stations operating as of October 2019.

This expansion will allow Mumbai to connect with its satellite cities that lay in the Mumbai Metropolitan Region.

Each line of the Mumbai Metro is identified by a specific color. The system uses rolling stocks of standard gauge trains and has a combination of elevated, underground and at-grade lines.

Metro stations

Statistics

Notes

See also

List of Namma Metro stations
List of Kolkata Metro stations
List of Delhi Metro stations
List of Jaipur Metro stations
List of Chennai Metro stations
List of Lucknow Metro stations
List of Kochi Metro stations
List of Noida Metro stations
List of Nagpur Metro stations
List of Ahmedabad Metro stations
List of Hyderabad Metro stations

References

External links
MMOPL Homepage
MMRCL Homepage
MMRDA Homepage

Mumbai
Mumbai

Mumbai Metro stations